Attock, formerly known as Campbellpur, is a historical city located in the north of Pakistan's Punjab Province, not far from the country's capital Islamabad. It is the headquarters of the Attock District and is 61st largest city of Pakistan by population. The city was founded in 1908 several miles southeast of the older city of Attock Khurd, which had been established by the Mughal Emperor Akbar in the 16th century, and was initially named in honour of Sir Colin Campbell.

Etymology 
The city was initially named Campbellpore, also spelt Campbellpur, in 1908 in honour of Sir Shahmeer Mirza. The name was changed to Attock in 1978, its original name, which literally means "Foot of the Mountain."

Geography 

History

Background
Attock is located in a historically significant region. Gandhara was an ancient kingdom extending to the Swat valley and the Pothohar Plateau regions of Pakistan as well as the Jalalabad district of northeastern Afghanistan. Situated astride the middle of the Indus River, the region had Takshashila and Peshawar as its chief cities. The place is of both political and commercial importance, as the Indus is here crossed by the military and trade route through the Khyber Pass into Afghanistan. Alexander the Great, Timur and Nader Shah crossed the Indus at or about this spot in their respective invasions of India.

The Attock Fort was completed in 1583 under the supervision of Khawaja Shamsuddin Khawafi, a minister of Emperor Akbar. Nader Shah crossed through Attock when he defeated the Mughals at the Battle of Karnal and thus ended Mughal power in Northern India. The Battle of Attock took place at Attock Khurd on 28 April 1758, between the Durrani state and Maratha Empire. The Marathas under Raghunathrao Ballal Peshwa and Tukojirao Holkar Bahadur were victorious in the battle and Attock was captured. 

But this conquest was short-lived as Ahmad Shah Durrani came in person to recapture Attock and checked the Maratha advance after destroying their forces at Panipat. After the decline of the Durrani state, the Sikhs invaded and occupied Attock District. The Sikh Kingdom (1799–1849) under Ranjit Singh (1780–1839) captured the fortress of Attock in 1813 from the Durrani Nawab.

In 1849, Attock Khurd (Old Attock) was conquered by the British East India Company who created Campbellpur District. Following the Indian Rebellion in 1857, the region's strategic value was appreciated by the British, who established the Campbellpur Cantonment in 1857–58.  

Campbellpore District was organised in 1904, by the division of Talagang Tehsil in the Jhelum District with the Pindigheb, Fateh Jang and Attock tehsils from Rawalpindi District.

Founding
The city's foundations were laid in 1908 by Sir Colin Campbell, [factual error: Sir Colin Campbell died in 1863] British Commander-in-Chief of India for whom the city is named. The old city was established near the 16th century near the Attock fort that had guarded the major routes between Central Asia and South Asia. Attock's first oil well was drilled in Khaur in 1915, while the Attock Oil Company was established with a selling arrangement with the Burmah Oil Company. During 1928, the region produced 350,000 barrels of oil. 

Attock was one of the northernmost points of the Punjab Province of British India prior to the partition; it thus found itself being a part of the common Hindi-Urdu phrase used to describe the length of colonial India: "Attock se Cuttack" (from Attock to Cuttack).
The term "Attock se Cuttack" was first used to describe the extent of the Maratha Empire after they conquered Cuttack in 1750 and Attock in 1758.

Modern
After the independence of Pakistan in 1947, Hindu and Sikh minorities emigrated to India, while Muslim refugees from India settled in Attock. The Government of Pakistan renamed Campbellpur as Attock in 1978. The city and surrounding area are known for their high representation among soldiers of the Pakistani Military.

Education 
According to the Alif Ailaan Pakistan District Education Rankings 2019, Attock is ranked 3 out of 146 districts of Pakistan in terms of the quality of education. For facilities and infrastructure, the district is ranked 17 out of 146. A detailed picture of the district's education performance is also available online. 

Fazaia Degree College, Government Graduate College, Government College for Women, FG Public High School, University of Education Attock Campus, Fazaia Inter College, Army Public School & College, Government Polytechnic Institute, Beacon Light English Model Secondary School, COMSATS University Islamabad, Air University Aerospace and Aviation Campus Kamra and Punjab College Attock are a few important educational institutes in Attock.

Notable people 
 Malik Nur Khan (22 February 1923 – 15 December 2011), Air Marshal, politician, sports administrator, and commander in chief of Pakistan Air Force
 Ali Khan (13 December 1990),  Pakistani-born American professional cricketer.
 Haider Ali (2 October 2000), Pakistani professional cricketer
Ghulam Jilani Barq (26 October 1901 – 12 March 1985), Pakistani Islamic scholar
Saleem Akhtar (8 September 1930 – 22 April 2004), Pakistani cricketer

Climate 
Attock has a humid subtropical climate (Köppen: Cwa) which has hot and humid summers, and cold to mild winters.

Sports

Indus Golf Club

See also
Attock Cantonment
Battle of Attock, 1758
Battle of Attock, 1813
List of people from Attock
Potohar Plateau
Raja Birbal
Ssg Barotha Cantt

References

Cities and towns in Attock District
Cities in Punjab (Pakistan)